"I Can't Wait Any Longer" is a single by American country music artist Bill Anderson. Released in April 1978, it was the first single from his album Love and Other Sad Stories. The song peaked at number 4 on the Billboard Hot Country Singles chart. It also reached number 1 on the RPM Country Tracks chart in Canada.

Blending country and disco, it was Anderson's fifth and final Hot 100 hit.

Charts

Weekly charts

Year-end charts

References

1978 singles
Bill Anderson (singer) songs
Songs written by Bill Anderson (singer)
Songs written by Buddy Killen
1978 songs
MCA Records singles